The Potti Sreeramulu Telugu University (PSTU) is one of the few Indian language universities in India.

University

It was established as "Telugu University" on 2 December 1985 through an Act of Legislation (Act No. 27 of 1985) by the State Legislature of the-then united Andhra Pradesh with headquarters at Hyderabad and satellite campuses at Srisailam and Rajamahendravaram. The School of Folk and Tribal Lore was established at Warangal during the year 1994. This university was founded with the broad objectives of serving the cause of the Telugu people, both within the State and outside. For this purpose, the state government has merged the Sahitya, Sangeet, Nataka, Nritya and Lalita Kala Academies, International Telugu Institute and Telugu Bhasha Samiti into the university. Thus, the university was established to function as a central organization for teaching and research in Language and Literature, History and Culture, Fine Arts and Performing Arts, religion and philosophy of the Telugu speaking people. It strives to inculcate a sense of identity in them as citizens of India and as responsible representatives of Andhra Pradesh and Telangana. This university was renamed as "Potti Sreeramulu Telugu University" in the year 1998. The University Grants Commission has recognized the university as fit to receive financial grants since 2 May 1990.

Campuses
There are five campuses of Telugu University in Telangana and Andhra Pradesh:
Lalita Kalatoranam, Hyderabad
Nannaya Pranganam, Rajamahendravaram
Palkuriki Somanatha Pranganam, Srisailam
Potana Pranganam, Warangal
Sri Siddhendra Yogi Peetham, Kuchipudi

Library
Telugu University Library is established in the year 1985 in Osmania University campus. It has three Campus libraries at Srisailam, Rajahmundry and  Warangal. Library contains various titles on the subjects like Telugu language, literature, Linguistics, Fine arts, Astrology, Journalism, Culture, Folk arts. 
 
The Central library has equipped with rich collection consisting of about 100,000 books among which 55,000 are Telugu, 43,000 English and 5000 of other Indian languages. It subscribes to about 150 subject journals in Telugu and English. Library is also maintaining about 10,000 back volumes of various journals. The library has acquired rare and unique collection of Palm leaves, Mackenzie manuscripts, letters of C. P. Brown, microfilms of Telugu dailies Krishna Patrika for 40 years (1902–1942), and Andhra Patrika for 26 years (1914–1940). 
 
The university has an invaluable collection of books received by donations/purchase of personal collection of social elites/eminent scholars as a collection development policy. The donors included Mudigonda Subrahmanya Sarma, Seetapati, Mallela Sriramamurti, Kosaraju Raghavaiah, M. V. Rajgopal, Thumati Donappa, Vasireddy Seeta Devi, V. Raja Rao, Mateti Ramappa, P. N. V. Rao, Puranam Subrahmanya Sarma, K. Venkateswara Rao, Abburi Chaya Devi, K. Venkata Ramaraju, Thenneti Purnachandra Rao, Gayatri Rama Rao and Bommakanti Srinivasacharyulu. Libraries purchased from individuals are Nelaturu Venkata Ramanaiah, Mallampalli Somasekhara Sarma, P. S. R. Appa Rao, Rayaprolu Subba Rao, Kothapalli Veerabhadra Rao, P. V. Parabrahmha Sastri and N. S. Sundareswara Rao.

Museum
Telugu University Museum has three galleries. The History gallery has 52 oil paintings. The Contemporary Art gallery has 124 canvas paintings by eminent artists. The Portrait gallery displays 220 portraits of Telugu luminaries in various fields and 211 Nataratnas, distinguished stage artists acquired from film actor Mikkilineni.

Official Magazine
Telugu University is Publishing "Telugu Vaani", a Tri-Monthly Magazine. The Magazine covers news regarding Festivals of Fine Arts, Cultural Programmes, Seminars and other activities of university and its Campuses. It publishes the news of various programmes conducted by Telugu Associations within and outside Andhra Pradesh.

See also 
 Kannada University
 Tamil University
 Malayalam University
 Punjabi University
 World Telugu Conference

References

External links

Official Website of Potti Sreeramulu Telugu University

Educational institutions established in 1985
Universities in Hyderabad, India
Language education in India
1985 establishments in Andhra Pradesh
State universities in Telangana